Uthal is an administrative subdivision (tehsil) of Lasbela District in the Balochistan province of Pakistan. The tehsil is administratively subdivided into seven Union Councils and is headquartered at the city of Uthal.

Demography
The Bela population consists of Sindhis, Balochis, Brahui and Punjabis. The population is predominantly Muslim.

Education
The Lasbela University of Agriculture, Water and Marine Science is located in Uthal.

References

Tehsils of Lasbela District